These are a list of settlements in Lasithi, Crete, Greece.

 Achladia
 Agia Triada
 Agios Antonios
 Agios Georgios, Oropedio Lasithiou
 Agios Georgios, Siteia
 Agios Ioannis
 Agios Konstantinos
 Agios Nikolaos
 Agios Stefanos
 Anatoli
 Apidi
 Armenoi
 Avrakontes
 Chamezi
 Chandras
 Choumeriakos
 Chrysopigi
 Elounta
 Episkopi
 Exo Lakkonia
 Exo Mouliana
 Exo Potamoi
 Ferma
 Fourni
 Gdochia
 Goudouras
 Gra Lygia
 Ierapetra
 Kalamafka
 Kalo Chorio
 Kaminaki
 Karydi, Agios Nikolaos
 Karydi, Itanos
 Kastelli
 Kato Chorio
 Kato Metochi
 Katsidoni
 Kavousi
 Koutsouras
 Kritsa
 Kroustas
 Krya
 Lagou
 Lastros
 Latsida
 Limnes
 Lithines
 Loumas
 Makry Gialos
 Makrylia
 Males
 Marmaketo
 Maronia
 Mesa Lakkonia
 Mesa Lasithi
 Mesa Mouliana
 Meseleroi
 Milatos
 Mitato
 Mochlos
 Monastiraki
 Mournies
 Myrsini
 Myrtos
 Mythoi
 Neapoli
 Nikithianos
 Oreino
 Pacheia Ammos
 Palaikastro
 Pappagiannades
 Pefkoi
 Perivolakia
 Piskokefalo
 Plati
 Praisos
 Prina
 Psychro
 Riza
 Roussa Ekklisia
 Schinokapsala
 Sfaka
 Siteia
 Skinias
 Skopi
 Stavrochori 
 Stavromenos
 Tourloti
 Tzermiado
 Vainia
 Vasiliki
 Voulismeni
 Vrachasi
 Vrouchas
 Vryses
 Xerokambos
 Zakros 
 Zenia
 Ziros

By municipality

See also
List of towns and villages in Greece

 
Lasithi